Bucculatrix herbalbella is a moth in the family Bucculatricidae. It was described by Pierre Chrétien in 1915. It is found in North Africa and from Austria to Spain, Italy and North Macedonia.

The wingspan is 5–6 mm.

The larvae feed on Artemisia herba-alba. They mine the leaves of their host plant. Larvae can be found from March to April and again from October to November.

References

Arctiidae genus list at Butterflies and Moths of the World of the Natural History Museum

Bucculatricidae
Moths described in 1915
Moths of Africa
Moths of Europe
Leaf miners